Cesare Rossi (born 21 September 1887 in Pescia – died 9 August 1967 in Rome) was an Italian fascist leader who later became estranged from the regime.

Syndicalism
Rossi began his political career on the left with the Italian Socialist Party and as a writer for various syndicalist journals. However he left the Socialists in 1907 to serve in the Italian Army and did not rejoin following his demobilisation. Instead he embraced syndicalism fully by becoming a leading member of the Unione Sindacale Italiana. He joined the Fasci di Azione Rivoluzionaria in 1914 and by 1919 this had led to him joining the Fasci italiani di combattimento.

Fascism
A leading writer for Il Popolo d'Italia, Rossi was recognised as one of Benito Mussolini's closest advisers in the early days of the fascist movement. Rossi soon gained a reputation for his moderation and was instrumental in the Pact of Pacification, a 1921 agreement that temporarily slowed down the violence of the Blackshirts. Working with Mussolini he also developed a strategy of trying to win over the left into a cross-class alliance. He attained the rank of assistant secretary of the movement in 1921 and was effective leader in Tuscany whilst he went on to sit on the National Fascist Party national council and the Grand Council of Fascism.

He was the leader of a fasci and an important figure in the March on Rome. Following this seizure of power Rossi was appointed director of Mussolini's Press and Propaganda Office. He was also central in organising not only the 1924 election but also the reprisals against the areas that had rejected fascism which followed. A potential conflict of interest had arisen in February 1923 when Mussolini banned Fascist Party members from involvement in Freemasonry but ultimately the ban was not enforced as Rossi was just one of a number of Freemasons prominent within the party.

Allegations of murder
Rossi's rise through the ranks of the fascist state came to an abrupt end in 1924 with the murder of Giacomo Matteotti after he was accused of being responsible. It was argued that Rossi, who had flown into a rage after one of the two speeches that sealed Matteotti's fate, had ordered his deputy Amerigo Dumini to kill the Socialist deputy for his anti-fascism. The incident, which angered even some fascists, led to a split between Rossi and Mussolini.

Rossi fled to France and then Switzerland to escape prosecution and became a critic of fascism in his exile. He was tricked into returning to Italy in 1928 and was sentenced to 30 years imprisonment for his part in the murder. He was released after the fall of fascism and, following some investigations into his own past that acquitted him of involvement in the excesses of fascism, he returned to journalism and left politics behind.

In the Florestano Vancini's film The Assassination of Matteotti (1973), Rossi is played by Cesare Barbetti.

Further reading
 Mauro Canali, Il delitto Matteotti, Bologna, Il Mulino, 2004.
 Mauro Canali, Cesare Rossi. Da sindacalista rivoluzionario a eminenza grigia del fascismo, Bologna, Il Mulino, 1991.

References

1887 births
1967 deaths
Italian fascists
Italian male journalists
Italian soldiers
Italian Socialist Party politicians
National syndicalists
People from Pescia
Exiled Italian politicians
20th-century Italian journalists